This is a list of awards, nominations, recognitions and achievements received by Daniel Padilla during his career.

International Awards

100 Asian Heartthrobs

Kids' Choice Awards
The Nickelodeon Kids' Choice Awards, also known as the KCAs or Kids Choice Awards, is an annual awards show that airs on the Nickelodeon cable channel, which is usually held on a Saturday night in late March or early April, that honors the year's biggest television, movie, and music acts, as voted by Nickelodeon viewers.

Face of the Year Awards

Independent Critics

World Music Awards
The World Music Awards honours the best-selling most popular recording artists from every continent. The World Music Awards are presented on sales merit and voted by the public on the Internet. There is no jury involved and the Awards truly reflect the most popular artists as they are determined by the actual fans who vote and buy the records.

Music

ASAP 24k Gold Awards

ASAP 8th Platinum Circle Awards

Awit Awards

The Awit Awards is an expression of the Filipino's undying passion for music - music etched in every Filipino's heart. Awit Awards is a prestigious award-giving body, spearheaded by PARI (The Philippine Association of The Record Industry, INC.), that gives recognition to Filipino performing artists and people behind the making of Filipino recorded music.

Himig Handog

Myx Music Awards
The MYX Music Awards is an accolade presented by the cable channel Myx to honor the biggest hitmakers in the Philippines. The winners in 17 major categories decided via SMS text messaging by 2010 it is 60% fan votes through internet and 40% artists votes.

PMPC Star Awards for Music

MOR Pinoy Music Awards
ABS-CBN’s FM radio station MOR 101.9 annually celebrate Original Pilipino Music and recognized some of the best music artists in the industry. Winners are determined based on total votes from texters, MOR Pinoy Music Awards committee, and select panel of judges from the Organisasyon ng Pilipinong Mang-aawit (OPM).

Film and Television

Film Development Council of the Philippines

FAMAS Awards
FAMAS Awards is the annual honors given by the Filipino Academy of Movie Arts and Sciences (FAMAS), an organization composed of prize-winning writers and movie columnists, for achievements in the Philippine cinema for a calendar year.

GMMSF Box-Office Entertainment Awards

Luna Awards

Metro Manila Film Festival

PMPC Star Award for Movie

PMPC Star Awards for Television

Young Critics Circle

Popularity and Commerciality

ASAP Pop Viewers' Choice Awards

ASAP's Pop Teen Choice Awards

Anak TV Awards
Anak TV Awards is recognition for personalities and programs that are certified child-friendly as voted by parents, teachers, non-government organizations, and other sectors of society.

EdukCircle Awards

The EdukCircle recognizes exemplary performances of personalities in news and entertainment whose professional works have made significant contributions to Philippine music, film and television.

FMTM Awards for TV Entertainment Section

Push Awards

Urduja Heritage Film Awards

Urduja Film Festival is an annual undertaking to promote independent Films in Northern Luzon: Region 1, 2, 3 and CAR. It envisioned to hone the artistic and creative minds of the populace in the make-believe artistry of the celluloid world. The winners selected by jury which is headed by a Famas member, and composed of film critics both from the indie and mainstream.

Accolades From Media

ALTA Media Icon Awards 
The University of Perpetual Help System DALTA, in celebration of its Founding Anniversary, recognized outstanding individuals, programs, and other entities in the field of mass media. The winners were chosen by college students of University of Perpetual Help - Las Piñas while a separate screening committee composed of esteemed administrators and educators judged the nominees for the Media Icon awards.

Candy Readers Choice Awards

Candy Style Awards

EDDYS Entertainment Editors' Awards 
Organized by the Society of Philippine Entertainment Editors, the Eddys aims to encourage local filmmakers, producers, writers, and actors to continue pursuing their passion of creating films that mirror the realities of our society.

Kakulay Teen Choice Awards

PEP List Awards 

The PEP List Year is the only audited award-giving body given by Philippine Entertainment Portal in the Philippines where outstanding celebrities and showbiz personalities are recognized for their contribution to the industry for the past year. The PEPsters’ Choice winners are the celebrities with the most number of public votes.

Rappler Social Media Awards

RAWR Awards

Star Cinema Online Awards

StarStudio Celebrity Style Awards

Yahoo! Philippines OMG! Awards

Yes! Magazine

Miscellaneous

Star Magic Awards

Star Magic Sportfest

LionhearTV

NBS Fan Favorites

Inside Showbiz People's Choice Awards

VP Choice Awards

References

Awards
Lists of awards received by Filipino musician
Lists of awards received by Filipino actor